Peperomia perciliata is a species of plant in the genus Peperomia of the family Piperaceae. It is native to Colombia.

References

perciliata
Flora of Colombia